Afrika Rising is an album by jazz flautist Nicole Mitchell with her group Black Earth Ensemble. It was released in 2002 by Dreamtime, Mitchell's own label.

Reception
The Exclaim! review by David Dacks says "Afrika Rising builds on Mitchell's successful debut, Vision Quest, a year ago and is forward-thinking jazz that swings like crazy." JazzTimes wrote: "The music is deeply informed by African rhythm and counterpoint as well as by big-band jazz of both the classic and eccentric (à la Sun Ra) varieties. Mitchell uses many voices masterfully, none more so than her own".

Track listing
All compositions by Nicole Mitchell except where noted.

 "Afrika Rising Mvmt I: The Ancient Power Awakens" – 8:34
 "Afrika Rising Mvmt II: Metemorphosis" – 7:33
 "Afrika Rising Mvmt III: Intergalactic Healing" – 5:39
 "Peaceful Village Town" – 5:17
 "Emerging Light" – 0:53
 "Umoja (intro)" – 1:01
 "Umoja" – 5:42
 "Bluerise" – 10:49
 "Goldmind" (melody from "Wade in the Water", traditional) – 2:07
 "Wheatgrass" – 7:57
 "Toward Vision Quest" – 3:21

Personnel
Nicole Mitchell – flute, piccolo, vocals
 David Boykin – saxophone, clarinet, vocals
 Tony Herrera – trombone, shells, vocals
 Steve Berry – trombone 
 Savoir Faire – violin, vocals
 Edith Yokley – violin
 Tomeka Reid – cello
 Miles Tate III – piano
 Jim Baker – piano
 Wanda Bishop – piano, vocals
 Darius Savage – double bass
 Josh Abrams – bass, vocals
 Hamid Drake – drums
 Isaiah Spencer – drums
 Arveeayl Ra – drums, vocals
 Jovia Armstrong – percussion
 Coco Elysses – percussion

References

2002 albums
Nicole Mitchell (musician) albums